CCR4-NOT transcription complex, subunit 4 is a protein that in humans is encoded by the CNOT4 gene.

Function 

The protein encoded by this gene is a subunit of the CCR4-Not complex, a global transcriptional regulator and deadenylase. The encoded protein interacts with CNOT1 and has ubiquitin ligase activity. Several transcript variants encoding different isoforms have been found for this gene.[provided by RefSeq, Jul 2010].  Diseases associated with CNOT4 include Adenoiditis.

References

Further reading 

 
 
 
 
 
 
 
 
 

Genes
Human proteins